Everblack is the second album by Danish extreme metal band Mercenary, and the second through Hammerheart Records. It is the first album to include future lead singer Mikkel Sandager and his brother Morten Sandager on keyboards. This is also the only album to feature Signar Petersen on lead guitars and the last to feature Rasmus Jacobsen on drums. With this album, Mercenary continued along with their death metal roots, but also started to explore their sound with thrash metal elements, as well as clean vocals done by Mikkel Sandager.

Track listing

Personnel
Jakob Mølbjerg – rhythm guitar
Mikkel Sandager – clean vocals
Henrik "Kral" Andersen – death growls, bass
Morten Sandager – keyboards
Rasmus Jacobsen – drums
Signar Petersen – lead guitar

Produced, arranged, mixed, and mastered by Jacob Hansen. Art by Travis Smith.

References

2002 albums
Mercenary (band) albums
Albums produced by Jacob Hansen